International Wrestling Association was a professional wrestling promotion based in Cleveland, Ohio from 1975 to 1978. Former employees in the IWA consisted of professional wrestlers, managers, play-by-play and color commentators, announcers, interviewers and referees.

Alumni

Male wrestlers

Female wrestlers

Midget wrestlers

Stables and tag teams

Managers and valets

Commentators and interviewers

Referees

Other personnel

References
General

Specific

External links
IWA - International Wrestling Association (1975-1976)
International Wrestling Association alumni at Wrestlingdata.com

International Wrestling Association alumni